Alvin John Krueger (April 3, 1919 – February 20, 1999) was an American football end in the National Football League (NFL) for the Washington Redskins.  He also played in the All-America Football Conference (AAFC) for the Los Angeles Dons.  He played college football at the University of Southern California.  Krueger received the winning touchdown pass from quarterback Doyle Nave over a no-scoring Duke team in the 1939 Rose Bowl.  He and Nave were named Co-MVP for that game and were later inducted into the Rose Bowl Hall of Fame.

References

External links
 
 Los Angeles Times Obituary
 

1919 births
1999 deaths
Sportspeople from Orange, California
American football wide receivers
United States Navy personnel of World War II
Los Angeles Dons players
USC Trojans football players
Washington Redskins players
United States Navy officers
Military personnel from California